The right to life movement or pro-life movement opposes abortion, assisted suicide, and euthanasia on moral grounds. It is closely related to the anti-abortion movement and anti-euthanasia movement. The difference is that while the anti-abortion focuses on abortion and anti-euthanasia movement focuses on euthanasia and assisted suicide, the right-to-life movement covers all three issues. The terms "right to life" and "pro-life" are generally associated more with opposition to abortion than to assisted suicide and euthanasia, and many right-to-life organizations primarily focus on abortion, but most organizations oppose all three.

In the United States, the National Right to Life Committee is the largest right-to-life organization.

Notes and references

Social movements
20th-century social movements
21st-century social movements‎ 
Social movements
Anti-abortion movement